Wigancice  is a village in the administrative district of Gmina Ziębice, within Ząbkowice Śląskie County, Lower Silesian Voivodeship, in south-western Poland. Prior to 1945 it was in Germany, then known as Weigelsdorf.

References

Wigancice